FC Zhemchuzhyna Odesa was a professional Ukrainian football from Odesa. The club was founded in 2013, but dissolved in 2018.

The club was admitted to Ukrainian Second League in 2016–17 season. In its first season in it, the club became the champion and received promotion to the First League. Early May 2018 club President Oleksandr Demenchuk stated that the club would dissolve because of financial reasons.

The club's name is Zhemchuzhyna which is foreign in Ukraine and means a pearl.

History
The club was created in August 2013 and formed from the graduates of the Odesa football school.  Initially, the team consisted football veterans from Odesa, friends of the club president, Oleksandr Babych, Gennady Nizhegorodov and Vitaliy Rudenko. From the first days of creation head coach of the club was a former defender of Chornomorets Odesa and Kryvbas Kryvyi Rih Denys Kolchin.

In the 2014–15 season the team participated in the Odesa City winter championship and won the championship defeating FC Real Pharma Odesa.

In 2015, the club debuted in the Amateur League of Ukraine, finishing in the eight best teams of the tournament and in 2016 they repeated in reaching the quarterfinals of the tournament.

The club was admitted to the PFL in 2016 and won the 2016–17 Ukrainian Second League. gaining promotion to Ukrainian First League.

On 4 May 2018, three matchdays before the end of 2017–18 Ukrainian First League season, PFL informed that the club withdrew from the competition due to dissolution. President Oleksandr Demenchuk confirmed dissolution of the club because of financial reasons.

Honors
Ukrainian Second League
Winners (1): 2016–17
 Odesa City Winter Championships: 2014–15

League and cup history

{|class="wikitable"
|-bgcolor="#efefef"
! Season
! Div.
! Pos.
! Pl.
! W
! D
! L
! GS
! GA
! P
!Cup
!colspan=2|Europe
!Notes
|-bgcolor=SteelBlue
|align=center rowspan=2|2015
|align=center rowspan=2|4th
|align=center|2
|align=center|6 	
|align=center|2 	 	
|align=center|3 	
|align=center|1 		
|align=center|5 	
|align=center|4 	
|align=center|9
|align=center rowspan=2|
|align=center rowspan=2|
|align=center rowspan=2|
|align=center|
|-bgcolor=SteelBlue
|align=center|4
|align=center|10 		
|align=center|4 	
|align=center|3 	 	
|align=center|3 	 	
|align=center|12 		
|align=center|10 	
|align=center|15
|align=center|
|-bgcolor=SteelBlue
|align=center|2016
|align=center|4th
|align=center|2
|align=center|6 		
|align=center|4 	 	 	
|align=center|1 	
|align=center|1 	 		
|align=center|12 		 	
|align=center|8 	  	
|align=center|13
|align=center|
|align=center|
|align=center|
|align=center| finals
|-bgcolor=PowderBlue
|align=center|2016–17
|align=center|3rd
|align=center bgcolor=gold|1
|align=center|32
|align=center|24
|align=center|4
|align=center|4
|align=center|75
|align=center|22
|align=center|76
|align=center| finals
|align=center|
|align=center|
|align=center bgcolor=lightgreen|Promoted
|-bgcolor=LightCyan
|align=center|2017–18
|align=center|2nd
|align=center|18
|align=center|34
|align=center|7 	
|align=center|6 	
|align=center|21 	
|align=center|33 	
|align=center|54 	
|align=center|27
|align=center| finals
|align=center|
|align=center|
|align=center bgcolor=pink|Withdrew
|}

Last-known squad

Coaches
 Nov 2014 – 21 Aug 2017: Denys Kolchin
 24 Aug 2017 – 22 Jan 2018: Leonid Haidarzhy 
 22 Jan 2018 – May 2018: Dmytro Horbatenko

References

External links
 Official website

 
Football clubs in Odesa
Defunct football clubs in Ukraine
Association football clubs established in 2013
2013 establishments in Ukraine
2018 disestablishments in Ukraine
Association football clubs disestablished in 2018